The Sri Lanka national cricket team toured Pakistan in February to March 1982 and played a three-match Test series against the Pakistan national cricket team. Pakistan won the Test series 2–0. Sri Lanka were captained by Bandula Warnapura and Pakistan by Javed Miandad. In addition, the teams played a three-match Limited Overs International (LOI) series which Pakistan won 2–1.

Test series summary

First Test

Second Test

Third Test

One Day Internationals (ODIs)

Pakistan won the Wills Series 2-1.

1st ODI

2nd ODI

3rd ODI

References

External links

1982 in Sri Lankan cricket
1982 in Pakistani cricket
1982
International cricket competitions from 1980–81 to 1985
Pakistani cricket seasons from 1970–71 to 1999–2000